Polarite, is an opaque, yellow-white mineral with the chemical formula . Its crystals are orthorhombic pyramidal, but can only be seen through a microscope. It has a metallic luster and leaves a white streak. Polarite is rated 3.5 to 4 on the Mohs Scale.

It was first described in 1969 for an occurrence in Talnakh, Norilsk in the Polar Ural Mountains in Russia. It has also been recorded from the Bushveld igneous complex of South Africa and from Fox Gulch, Goodnews Bay, Alaska.

References 

Palladium minerals
Bismuth minerals
Lead minerals
Orthorhombic minerals
Minerals in space group 36